Potamonautes lividus, also known as the blue river crab, is a species of decapod in the family Potamonautidae. P. lividus is endemic to the country of South Africa in a area of 200 kilometers squared. The species prefers inland freshwater bodies in wetlands, bogs, marshes, freshwater swamp forests and peatlands (mire). P. livisus is found most often in the province Kwa-Zulu Natal in South Africa with the species also living in Richards bay, Ntambanana, Mtubatuba and uncoifirmed sighting in the Amatikulu river which if confirmed, represents the southern most members of the Potamonautes lividus species.

The IUCN conservation status of Potamonautes lividus is "VU" or vulnerable. The species faces a high risk of endangerment in the medium term due to residential development and commercial development of its habitat. Humans damming and modification of their freshwater wetlands, bogs, marshes and peatlands (mires) habitats also contribute to their declining.

References

Decapods
Endemic crustaceans of South Africa
Crustaceans described in 2001
Articles created by Qbugbot